The 2021 Valdosta State Blazers football team represented Valdosta State University as a member of the Gulf South Conference (GSC) during the 2021 NCAA Division II football season. They were led by third-year head coach Gary Goff. The Blazers played their home games at Bazemore–Hyder Stadium in Valdosta, Georgia.

The Blazers competed for the 2021 NCAA Division II Football Championship Game against Ferris State. This was their first appearance in the championship game since the 2018 game.

Previous season
The Blazers finished the 2019 season 10–1, 8–0 in Gulf South Conference (GSC) play, to finish first in the conference standings. On August 12, 2020, Gulf South Conference postponed fall competition in 2020 for several sports due to the COVID-19 pandemic. A few months later in November, the conference announced that there will be no spring conference competition in football. Teams that opt-in to compete would have to schedule on their own. The Blazers did not compete in the 2020 season and opted out of spring competition.

Schedule

Rankings

References

Valdosta State
Valdosta State Blazers football seasons
Gulf South Conference football champion seasons
Valdosta State Blazers football